Tapijulapa is a community in the municipality of Tacotalpa, Tabasco. It is a mountain community ninety kilometres from the state capital of Villahermosa, named as a Pueblo Mágico (Magical Town) for its white houses with red tiles roofs along cobblestone streets, along with abundant vegetation. Its main landmark is the town church called Santiago Apóstol (Apostle James) as well as an ecological park called Kolem Jaá, one of the largest of its kind in Latin America. It is also noted for a festival in honor of Chaac, the Maya god of rain.

References

Tourist attractions in Tabasco
Pueblos Mágicos
Populated places in Tabasco